The first season of The Real Housewives of Miami, an American reality television series, was broadcast on Bravo. It aired from 	February 22, 2011 until April 5, 2011, and was primarily filmed in Miami, Florida. Its executive producers are Matt Anderson, Nate Green and Andy Cohen.

The Real Housewives of Miami focuses on the lives of Lea Black, Adriana De Moura, Alexia Echevarria, Marysol Patton, Larsa Pippen, and Cristy Rice. It consisted of seven episodes.

Production and crew
On March 10, 2010, Bravo announced the series (then titled Miami Social Club) had been picked up as a restructuring of the 2009 series, Miami Social. Later, after filming was completed, Bravo chose instead to make it another installment in the network's The Real Housewives franchise. Bravo announced on February 3, 2011, that the series would premiere later that month and that the fourth-season premiere of The Real Housewives of New York City, originally scheduled for February 15, would be pushed back until April. Shortly after the season aired, Andy Cohen went on the record stating the reason for the series broadcast, "we put it on because everyone in America was going through such a horrible winter and we just kind of realized we had Miami on the shelf." Cohen also claimed the series had few episodes to be "a six-week kind of antidote to all the winter madness." 

The season premiered with "Paradise Cost" on February 22, 2011, while the sixth episode "Miami Mamis Know Best" served as the season finale, and was aired on March 29, 2011. It was followed by a reunion special that aired on April 5, 2011, on Watch What Happens Live, which marked the conclusion of the season.
Matt Anderson, Nate Green and Andy Cohen are recognized as the series' executive producers; it is produced and distributed by Purveyors of Pop.

Cast and synopsis
Six housewives were featured during the first season of The Real Housewives of Miami, who were described as "homemakers, businesswomen, and philanthropists" and "six of the most connected and influential women of Miami". Shortly after the season aired, Andy Cohen described the women as "great characters".

Cristy Rice is recently divorced from NBA superstar Glen Rice, but she doesn't let that hold her back. Cristy balances her new phase of life being a single mom of three, running her own clothing store and living out loud while enjoying the nightlife. Larsa Pippen is an Assyrian Lebanese beauty who is a close friends to Cristy and wife of Scottie Pippen, another NBA superstar. Larsa balances her life successfully from being a wife, a mother to her four young kids, three boys and 1 girl, and a boss to her nannies she keeps firing. When Larsa isn't focusing on being a wife, mother, or boss, she enjoys spending a little time on herself.
Lea Black, who is originally from Texas, is a maven of Miami, juggling family, business and social events. When Lea isn't raising her son, RJ, with her husband Roy Black, a top criminal defense attorney,  she is running her businesses and raising money for charity. Lea has raised millions of dollars over nineteen years for troubled teens through The Blacks' Annual Gala, of which she is a founder of. Adriana De Moura, an art curator who is well-known in Miami for being the Brazilian Bombshell of the Miami art scene. Before settling in Miami and in one of Miami's most exclusive areas, Hibiscus Island, she studied French Art and Civilization at Paris' Sorbonne Institute, as well as Italian Art in Florence. De Moura takes pride in being a polyglot and cultured, knowing how to speak five languages and having traveled to over 40 countries. Alexia Echevarria, the Executive Editor of Venue Magazine is often referred to as the "Cuban Barbie." Alexia and her husband, Herman, are the epitome of the “Who's Who” in Miami as they share photo shoots with Marc Anthony to luncheons with Barack Obama. Alexia is mother to her two sons, Peter and Frankie, however she admits at times she's more of an older sister to them. Marysol Patton is a native to Miami, and having been divorced for 10 years it allows her the time and energy to focus  on her career. Marysol has created and continues to run one of the premiere public relations firms in town, The Patton Group. When Marysol isn't work or throwing a party for her A-list clients, she's at home with her mother, Elsa.

 Unlike most Housewives reunions, this one takes place on the Watch What Happens Live set. The usual couches are replaced by separate seats placed closely together making a triangular formation.

Episodes

References

External links

The Real Housewives of Miami
2011 American television seasons